For the Egyptian encyclopedist see Shihab al-Din abu 'l-Abbas Ahmad ben Ali ben Ahmad Abd Allah al-Qalqashandi.

Shihab al-Din abu l-‘Abbas Ahmad ibn Mohammed ibn Mohammed ibn Ahmed ibn Ali ibn 'Abd ar-Rahman ibn Abi'l-'Afiyya al-Miknasi az-Zanati, known simply as Ahmad ibn al-Qadi or Ibn al-Qadi (1552/15531616), was a Moroccan polygraph. He was the leading writer from Ahmad al-Mansur's court in Morocco next to Abd al-Aziz al-Fishtali. He was also a renowned judge and mathematician.

Biography 
Ahmad ibn al-Qadi was born in Fez in 1552/1553. His family was called the Ibn al-Qadi, a Berber family that belonged to the Miknasa tribe, a tribe of the Zenata confederation. Their ancestor was the Miknasi tribal chief, Musa ibn Abi al-Afiya. Several members of this family were established in Fez and Meknes. The Ibn al-qadi family gave birth to distinguished people, who, during the previous centuries, had held high political or religious offices and had become famous as islamic scholars.

Ahmad Ibn al-Qadi studied with Abd al-Wahid al-Sijilmasi, the famous Moroccan mufti and Ahmad Baba al Massufi. The jurisdiction of Salé was assigned to him. At the age of 34 he undertook a journey to the east, but his ship was captured by Christian pirates. Ibn al-Qadi spent eleven months in captivity and was released thanks to sultan Ahmad al-Mansur who paid as ransom the equivalent of 20 thousand ounces of gold.

Works 
A number of Ibn al-Qadi's scholarly works survive, including two collections of biographies of great documentary value:

Al-Muntaqa al-maqsur 'ala ma'athir al-khilafat Abi al-Abbas al-Mansur; his primary work, a panegyric of al-Mansur's great character that qualify him the rightful caliph of Islam.
Jadwat al Iqtibas Fi-man halla min al'alam madinata fas ('The Torch of learning in the recollection of the most influential notables of the city of Fez')
Dhīl wafayāt al-'ayān al-musamā<<Durrat al-hidjāl fī asmā’ al-ridjāl>> Appendix to obituaries of the notable names.

References

Sources

 
 

1550s births
1616 deaths
16th-century Berber people
17th-century Berber people
16th-century Moroccan historians
17th-century Moroccan historians
16th-century Moroccan poets
17th-century Moroccan poets
Berber historians
Berber poets
Berber writers
Miknasa
Moroccan mathematicians
People from Fez, Morocco